Craig Macconacie (born 10 November 1977) is a former English cricketer.  Macconacie was a right-handed batsman who bowled right-arm medium-fast.  He was born in Leicester, Leicestershire.

Macconacie represented the Leicestershire Cricket Board in 2 List A matches against Denmark in the 1st round of the 2003 Cheltenham & Gloucester Trophy, and the Kent Cricket Board in the 2nd round of the same competition.  Both matches were held in 2002.  In his 2 List A matches, he scored 49 runs at a batting average of 49, with a high score of 25, with one not out innings.

References

1977 births
Living people
Cricketers from Leicester
English cricketers
Leicestershire Cricket Board cricketers